Highs in the Mid-Sixties, Volume 4 (subtitled Chicago) is a compilation album in the Highs in the Mid-Sixties series, featuring recordings that were released in Chicago, Illinois.  Two of the later releases among the CDs in the Pebbles series, Pebbles, Volume 6 and Pebbles, Volume 7 also concentrate on Chicago bands.

Release data
This album was released in 1983 as an LP by AIP Records (as #AIP-10006).

Notes on the tracks
The A-side of this single by the Foggy Notions, "I Need a Little Lovin'" is included on the Pebbles, Volume 10 LP and the Pebbles, Volume 6 CD.  The better known "I Can Only Give You Everything" by the Little Boy Blues is on Pebbles, Volume 2.  "(I) Live in the Springtime" also appears on the Pebbles, Volume 8 LP, credited to The Lemon Drops.  "La Da Da" – a takeoff on a Dale Hawkins song called "La Do Da Da" – is the first single by the Malibus; another of their songs is on the Pebbles, Volume 7 CD.  The final track is a plea by the band to get a spot on The Ed Sullivan Show, in the style of the 1960 novelty hit by Larry Verne, "Please Mr. Custer".

Track listing

Side one

 The Little Boy Blues: "The Great Train Robbery" (Jordan Miller), 2:38
 The Omens: "Searching" (Revercomb/Allen), 2:24
 The Shaprels: "Dare I Weep, Dare I Mourn" (The Shaprels), 2:45
 The Boys: "Come with Me" (Ron Bucciarelli), 2:29
 The Misty Blues: "I Feel No Pain" (The Misty Blues), 2:31
 The Reasons Why: "All I Really Need Is Love" (Larry Basil), 2:29
 Buzzsaw (aka The Lemon Drops): "Live in the Springtime" (Roger Weiss), 2:55
 The Todds: "I Want Her Back" (Todd/Gluth), 2:30

Side two
 Group, Inc.: "Like a Woman" (Ron Ortega), 1:58
 The Foggy Notions: "Take Me Back and Hold Me" (Suekoff/Kaplan/Hoy/Mezique), 2:30
 The Pattens: "Say Ma, Ma" (The Pattens), 1:50
 The Malibus: "La Da Da" (The Malibus), 2:36
 The Delights: "Long Green" (Lynn Easton), 2:20
 The Untamed: "Someday Baby" (Reeves/Drews), 2:22
 Dalek: The Blackstones: "Never Feel the Pain" (G. Bryan), 2:30
 Warners Brothers: "Please Mr. Sullivan" (Warners Brothers/Whiteside), 2:32

Pebbles (series) albums
1983 compilation albums
Music of Chicago